Utagawa Kunisada III (歌川国貞) (1848–1920) was an ukiyo-e printmaker of the Utagawa school, specializing in yakusha-e (pictures of kabuki actors). He began studying under Utagawa Kunisada I at the age of 10, and continued under Kunisada II after their master's death.

He originally signed his prints "Kunimasa" or "Baidō Kunimasa".  About 1889, he began signing his prints "Kunisada", "Baidō Kunisada" or "Kōchōrō Kunisada".  By 1892, he was using "Hōsai", "Kōchōrō Hōsai", "Baidō Hōsai", and "Utagawa Hōsai".

References
 Newland, Amy Reigle, "In the Shadow of Another, Introducing the 'Meiji no Edokko' Baidō Hōsai", Andon, No 89, 2010, pp. 5–26.

Footnotes

Ukiyo-e artists
1848 births
1920 deaths
19th-century Japanese painters
20th-century Japanese painters
20th-century printmakers
Kunisada III
Japanese printmakers